Dinis of Braganza (1481–1516) was the younger son of Fernando II, Duke of Braganza and Isabella of Viseu who was a daughter of Infante Fernando, Duke of Viseu and Beatrice of Portugal.

Marriage and issue
He married Beatriz de Castro Osório, 3rd Countess of Lemos, in 1501, among their descendants are future Dukes of Braganza and John IV of Portugal.

Dinis and Beatriz had four children:

 Fernando Rodrigues de Castro (1505–1575)
 Afonso de Lencastre
 Isabel de Lencastre (1514–1558). Married her cousin Teodósio I, Duke of Braganza
 Maria de Lencastre

Ancestry

External links 

1481 births
1516 deaths